The 1923–24 WCHL season was the third season for the Western Canada Hockey League (WCHL). Four teams played 30 games each. The Calgary Tigers defeated the Regina Capitals to win the WCHL title. Calgary moved on to the Stanley Cup playoffs, losing in the Final to the Montreal Canadiens.

League business

Regular season
The four teams played an interlocking schedule with the Pacific Coast Hockey Association (PCHA) teams.

Final standings
Note: W = Wins, L = Losses, T = Ties, GF= Goals For, GA = Goals Against, Pts = Points

Scoring leaders

Playoffs
The Calgary Tigers played off against Regina for the WCHL title.

Calgary wins two-game total-goals series 4–2.

The Tigers then played off against Pacific Coast Hockey Association (PCHA) champion Vancouver to advance to the Stanley Cup Final.

Calgary wins best-of-three series 2–1.

Stanley Cup Final

In the final, the Calgary Tigers would face the National Hockey League (NHL) champion Montreal Canadiens. Montreal had also defeated Vancouver to advance to the Final.  Montreal then defeated Calgary two games to none in the best-of-three series to win the Stanley Cup.

See also
1923–24 NHL season
1923–24 PCHA season
List of pre-NHL seasons

References

HockeyDB

Bibliography

 

Western Canada Hockey League seasons
WCHL